A principal direction can refer to one of the following:

Principal directions (geometry) - In differential geometry, one of the directions of principal curvature.
Principal directions - a term used in gear nomenclature.
In stress analysis, a set of axes where the normal stress vector is maximized. See Stress (mechanics)